Illustrirte Zeitung was Germany's first illustrated magazine that existed between 1843 and 1944. It was also known as Leipziger illustrirte Zeitung. The magazine described itself as the Germany's illustrated magazine with the international view.

History and profile
Illustrirte Zeitung was founded by Johann Jakob Weber in Leipzig in 1843. The Illustrated London News and L'Illustration which was published in Paris were the two models for the magazine which were both successful commercial enterprises.

The first issue of Illustrirte Zeitung was published on 1 July 1843. The magazine was a weekly news magazine which had a wide scope. It mostly covered news on daily affairs, public and social life, science and art, music, theatre and fashion. It was very popular among the bourgeois middle classes.

The magazine liberally employed big photographs and art. It made significant contributions to the use of photographs in news. However, at the initial phase of the magazine it was hard for Johann Jakob Weber to find quality photographs to publish in the magazine due to the lack of good illustrations produced in Germany. Therefore, photographs were mostly taken from British media for a while. Then the magazine began to employ the work by German artists.

Illustrirte Zeitung also included the theater-related essays by Roderich Benedix, Eduard Devrient, Heinrich Laube and Richard Wagner. Following the 5041st issue the magazine ceased publication in September 1944.

Circulation
Six months after its publication the circulation of Illustrirte Zeitung was 7,500 copies. In 1846 it sold 11,000 copies.

References

External links

 Scanned copies (1843-1877 at the Austrian National Library)

1843 establishments in Germany
1944 disestablishments in Germany
Defunct magazines published in Germany
German-language magazines
Magazines established in 1843
Magazines disestablished in 1944
Magazines published in Leipzig
News magazines published in Germany